Shu-Te University (STU) is a private university in Yanchao District, Kaohsiung, Taiwan.

Shu-Te University offers a wide range of undergraduate and graduate programs in various fields, including engineering, design, management, humanities, social sciences, and health sciences. 

The university has six colleges: the College of Engineering, the College of Design, the College of Management, the College of Humanities and Social Sciences, the College of Health Sciences, and the College of Continuing Education.

History
STU was founded in 1986 as Shu-Te Institute of Technology. On 1 August 2000, it was renamed to Shu-Te University.  Shu-Te University's art development workshop also manage and exhibit at Pier-2 Art Center.

Faculties
 College of Applied Social Science
 College of Design
 College of Informatics
 College of Liberal Education
 College of Management

Digital Technology and Game Design
In 2005, the first nationwide interaction and entertainment design (IED) program was established at Shu-Te University.

Notable alumni
 Sun Shu-may, pop singer, actress and TV host

See also
 List of universities in Taiwan
 Engineering education in Taiwan

References

External links
 
 School has high hopes for musical clothes
 Nation’s designers shine at iF awards
 Shu Te University reveals new `doctor of sexuality' course
 Taiwan’s young designers

1986 establishments in Taiwan
Educational institutions established in 1986
Universities and colleges in Kaohsiung
Universities and colleges in Taiwan
Technical universities and colleges in Taiwan